William Torrance Hays (September 7, 1837 – June 27, 1875) was a Canadian politician. He represented Huron North in the Legislative Assembly of Ontario as a Conservative member from 1867 to 1871.

He was born in Wilmot (later Haysville) in Upper Canada in 1837, the son of Irish immigrants. He became an attorney in 1862. He was captain in the local militia and served on the town council for Goderich.

External links 
Member's parliamentary history for the Legislative Assembly of Ontario
The Canadian parliamentary companion and annual register, 1869, HJ Morgan

1837 births
1875 deaths
Canadian people of Irish descent
People from the Regional Municipality of Waterloo
Progressive Conservative Party of Ontario MPPs